The R640 road is a regional road in Ireland, located near Cahir, County Tipperary.

References

Regional roads in the Republic of Ireland
Roads in County Tipperary